The Durham University Journal was the official journal of Durham University in England, from its foundation in 1876 until its cessation in 1995. At the beginning of its run, the journal focused primarily on news related to the university itself, but beginning with the interwar period the journal shifted to publishing academic articles unrelated to university business.

References 

1876 establishments in England
Durham University
Magazines published in England
Magazines established in 1876
Magazines disestablished in 1995